Rhyacophila acutiloba is a species of free-living caddisfly in the family Rhyacophilidae. It is found in North America.

References

Spicipalpia
Articles created by Qbugbot
Insects described in 1971